Yakty-Kul (Yaqtıkül) is a rural locality (a village) in Podlubovsky Selsoviet, Karmaskalinsky District, Bashkortostan, Russia. The population was 89 as of 2010. There is 1 street.

Geography 
Yakty-Kul is located 34 km southwest of Karmaskaly (the district's administrative centre) by road. Podlubovo is the nearest rural locality.

References 

Rural localities in Karmaskalinsky District